Hip Hop Uncovered is a six part docuseries produced by Malcolm Spellman, from FX, which premiered in February 2021. The series discusses the connection between hip hop artists and street culture, and those behind the scenes who helped "bridge" them together. The stories are told through the eyes of Big U, Deb Antney, Bimmy, Trick Trick, and Hatian Jack who were considered players in connecting street culture with hip hop.

References

External links 
 Official page on FX

2020s American documentary television series
2021 American television series debuts
Works by Malcolm Spellman